Ibworth is a hamlet in Hampshire, England. It is in the civil parish of Hannington. Interesting features include a community notice board and a wall post box dating from the reign of Queen Victoria.

Governance
The hamlet of Ibworth is part of the civil parish of Hannington and is part of the Kingsclere ward of Basingstoke and Deane borough council. The borough council is a Non-metropolitan district of Hampshire County Council.

References

External links

Hamlets in Hampshire